The 1966 CFL season was the Canadian Football League's ninth season since the 1958 merger of the Interprovincial Rugby Football Union and the Western Interprovincial Football Union to create a national league. It was the 13th season in modern-day Canadian football.

CFL news in 1966
The Canadian Football League made several rule changes.  The league started to legalize unlimited blocking on rushing plays and introduced their new goose-necked goal posts.  The league rewrote its rule book and reduced it in size.

The Canadian Rugby Union, owners of the trophy, granted trusteeship of the Grey Cup to the Canadian Football League in exchange for annual financial support for amateur football.

One of the more notable games of the regular season was Montreal's 1–0 victory over Ottawa, the lowest scoring game in CFL history, and only the second 1–0 game since a 1949 win by Winnipeg over Calgary in the WIFU.

Regular season standings
Note: GP = Games Played, W = Wins, L = Losses, T = Ties, PF = Points For, PA = Points Against, Pts = Points

Bold text means that they have clinched the playoffs.
Saskatchewan and Ottawa have first round byes.

Grey Cup playoffs
Note: All dates in 1966

Conference semi-finals

Conference finals

Playoff bracket

Grey Cup Championship

CFL Leaders
 CFL Passing Leaders
 CFL Rushing Leaders
 CFL Receiving Leaders

1966 CFL All-Stars

Offence
QB – Russ Jackson, Ottawa Rough Riders
RB – George Reed, Saskatchewan Roughriders
RB – Jim Thomas, Edmonton Eskimos
RB – Dave Raimey, Winnipeg Blue Bombers
SE – Jim Worden, Saskatchewan Roughriders
TE – Tommy Joe Coffey, Edmonton Eskimos
F – Hugh Campbell, Saskatchewan Roughriders
C – Ted Urness, Saskatchewan Roughriders
OG – Al Benecick, Saskatchewan Roughriders
OG – Chuck Walton, Hamilton Tiger-Cats
OT – Bill Frank, Toronto Argonauts
OT – Frank Rigney, Winnipeg Blue Bombers
OT – Clyde Brock, Saskatchewan Roughriders

Defence
DT – John Barrow, Hamilton Tiger-Cats
DT – Don Luzzi, Calgary Stampeders
DE – Billy Ray Locklin, Hamilton Tiger-Cats
DE – E. A. Sims, Edmonton Eskimos
LB – Wayne Harris, Calgary Stampeders
LB – Phil Minnick, Winnipeg Blue Bombers
LB – Ken Lehmann, Ottawa Rough Riders
LB – Jim Conroy, Ottawa Rough Riders
DB – Gene Gaines, Ottawa Rough Riders
DB – Garney Henley, Hamilton Tiger-Cats
DB – Marv Luster, Toronto Argonauts
DB – Ed Ulmer, Winnipeg Blue Bombers
DB – Joe Poirier, Ottawa Rough Riders

1966 Eastern All-Stars

Offence
QB – Russ Jackson, Ottawa Rough Riders
RB – Don Lisbon, Montreal Alouettes
RB – Bo Scott, Ottawa Rough Riders
RB – Dave Thelen, Toronto Argonauts
TE – Ted Watkins, Ottawa Rough Riders
SE – Hal Patterson, Hamilton Tiger-Cats
F – Whit Tucker, Ottawa Rough Riders
C – Doug Specht, Ottawa Rough Riders
OG – Tony Pajaczkowski, Montreal Alouettes
OG – Chuck Walton, Hamilton Tiger-Cats
OT – Bill Frank, Toronto Argonauts
OT – Moe Racine, Ottawa Rough Riders

Defence
DT – John Barrow, Hamilton Tiger-Cats
DT – Angelo Mosca, Hamilton Tiger-Cats
DE – Billy Ray Locklin, Hamilton Tiger-Cats
DE – Billy Joe Booth, Ottawa Rough Riders
LB – Wilbert Scott, Montreal Alouettes
LB – Ken Lehmann, Ottawa Rough Riders
LB – Jim Conroy, Ottawa Rough Riders
DB – Gene Gaines, Ottawa Rough Riders
DB – Garney Henley, Hamilton Tiger-Cats
DB – Marv Luster, Toronto Argonauts
DB – Ed Learn, Montreal Alouettes
DB – Joe Poirier, Ottawa Rough Riders

1966 Western All-Stars

Offence
QB – Ron Lancaster, Saskatchewan Roughriders
RB – George Reed, Saskatchewan Roughriders
RB – Jim Thomas, Edmonton Eskimos
RB – Dave Raimey, Winnipeg Blue Bombers
SE – Jim Worden, Saskatchewan Roughriders
TE – Tommy Joe Coffey, Edmonton Eskimos
F – Hugh Campbell, Saskatchewan Roughriders
C – Ted Urness, Saskatchewan Roughriders
OG – Al Benecick, Saskatchewan Roughriders
OG – Jack Abendschan, Saskatchewan Roughriders
OG – Tom Hinton, BC Lions
OT – Frank Rigney, Winnipeg Blue Bombers
OT – Clyde Brock, Saskatchewan Roughriders

Defence
DT – Mike Cacic, BC Lions
DT – Don Luzzi, Calgary Stampeders
DE – Garner Ekstran, Saskatchewan Roughriders
DE – E. A. Sims, Edmonton Eskimos
LB – Wayne Harris, Calgary Stampeders
LB – Phil Minnick, Winnipeg Blue Bombers
LB – Wayne Shaw, Saskatchewan Roughriders
DB – Jerry Keeling, Calgary Stampeders
DB – Bob Kosid, Saskatchewan Roughriders
DB – Ernie Pitts, Winnipeg Blue Bombers
DB – Ed Ulmer, Winnipeg Blue Bombers
DB – Bill Redell, Edmonton Eskimos

1966 CFL Awards

 CFL's Most Outstanding Player Award – Russ Jackson (QB), Ottawa Rough Riders
 CFL's Most Outstanding Canadian Award – Russ Jackson (QB), Ottawa Rough Riders
 CFL's Most Outstanding Lineman Award – Wayne Harris (LB), Calgary Stampeders
 CFL's Coach of the Year – Frank Clair, Ottawa Rough Riders
 Jeff Russel Memorial Trophy (Eastern MVP) – Gene Gaines (DB), Ottawa Rough Riders
 Jeff Nicklin Memorial Trophy (Western MVP) - Ron Lancaster (QB), Saskatchewan Roughriders
 Gruen Trophy (Eastern Rookie of the Year) - Mike Wadsworth (DL), Toronto Argonauts
 Dr. Beattie Martin Trophy (Western Rookie of the Year) - Garry Lefebvre (WR/P), Edmonton Eskimos
 DeMarco–Becket Memorial Trophy (Western Outstanding Lineman) - Wayne Harris (LB), Calgary Stampeders

References 

CFL
Canadian Football League seasons